Rodion Rafailovich Nakhapetov (Russian: Родион Рафаилович Нахапетов; born 1944) is a Soviet-American-Russian actor, film director and screenwriter. He received the People's Artist of the RSFSR (1985). Asteroid 256697 Nahapetov, discovered by Russian amateur astronomer Timur Krjačko in 2008, was named in his honour. The official  was published by the Minor Planet Center on 15 June 2011.

Filmography

As actor 
 1964 — There Is Such a Lad
 1964 — The First Snow
 1965 — I Am Twenty
 1965 — A Mother's Heart
 1966 — A Mother's Fidelity
 1966 — Tenderness
 1967 — No Password Necessary
 1967 — Direct Line
 1969 — Lovers
 1969 — Old House
 1973 — That Sweet Word: Liberty!
 1975 — Dream and live
 1975 — A Slave of Love
 1978 — Suspicious
 1980 — Valentina
 1981 — Before the Door Closed
 1981 — Súdim ta láskou
 1982 — Two chapters of the family chronicle
 1982 — The Man Who Closed the Town
 1983 — Late Love
 1983 — Seraphim Polubes and Other Inhabitants of the Earth
 1983 — Torpedo
 1984 — Forgive Us, First Love
 1985 — Leap
 1985 — Someone Has to...
 1986 — Attempted Electrification
 1988 — Flight of Birds
 1988 — Morning Road
 1989 — It
 1997 — Telepath
 2001 — Destructive Power 2
 2001 — The Blood of Success
 2002 — Russian in the City of Angels
 2004 — Lovers 2
 2004 — Border Blues
 2005 — My Big Armenian Wedding
 2007 — Contamination
 2008 — Legacy
 2013 — Swear to defend
 2015 — Spider

As director  
 1972 — Dandelion Wine
 1973 — With You and Without You
 1975 — To the Edge of the World...
 1977 — The Enemies
 1979 — Do Not Shoot at White Swans
 1981 — About You
 1984 — The Follower
 1986 — An Umbrella for Lovers
 1987 — At the End of the Night
 1997 — Telepath
 2002 — Russian in the City of Angels
 2004 — My Big Armenian Wedding
 2004 — Border Blues
 2007 — Contamination

As screenwriter 
 1972 — Dandelion Wine
 1981 — About You
 1984 — Walking Trail
 2002 — Russian in the City of Angels
 2004 — Border Blues
 2007 — Contamination

References

External links 
 
 

American cinematographers
1944 births
Living people
Soviet male actors
American male actors
Russian male actors
Soviet film directors
American film directors
Russian film directors
Soviet screenwriters
American screenwriters
20th-century Russian screenwriters
Male screenwriters
20th-century Russian male writers
Russian film producers
People's Artists of the RSFSR
Honored Artists of the RSFSR
Recipients of the USSR State Prize
Actors from Dnipro
Gerasimov Institute of Cinematography alumni
Film people from Dnipro